Saw Min Hla was the chief queen consort of Ava from 1421 to 1425. Her son Min Hla briefly became king for three months in 1425, following the death of her second husband King Thihathu of Ava. Her first husband was Thihathu's elder brother Crown Prince Minye Kyawswa of the Forty Years' War fame. Her eldest child Minye Kyawhtin was the rebel king of Toungoo (Taungoo) from 1452 to 1459.

Brief
Saw Min Hla was a daughter of Tarabya I of Pakhan, and sister of Tarabya of Toungoo, who was viceroy of Toungoo from 1440 to 1446. In 1406, she was married to Prince Minye Kyawswa at his coronation ceremony as heir-apparent. Minye Kyawswa was a cousin. She and Minye Kyawswa had four children between 1408 and 1415: Minye Kyawhtin, Min Hla Htut, Minye Aung Naing and Saw Min Phyu. A year after Minye Kyawswa fell in action, she was made the chief consort of Minye Thihathu, Minye Kyawswa's younger brother and successor as heir-apparent. She had three children with Thihathu: Min Hla, Saw Pyei Chantha and Shwe Pyi Shin Me. In all, she had seven children (three sons and four daughters.)

When Thihathu became king in 1421, Saw Min Hla became the chief queen. But her rank as the chief queen was only nominal. Thihathu also took his father's favorite queen Shin Bo-Me as queen. He spent much time with Bo-Me that Saw Min Hla left the palace for a hall next to the Shwe Zedi Pagoda in the capital, and retired to religion. She hence became known as Tanzaung-shin Mibaya တန်ဆောင်းရှင် မိဖုရား).

Her fifth child Min Hla became king in August 1425 after Thihathu was assassinated in a plot arranged by Shin Bo-Me. Three months later, the eight-year-old king was poisoned by Shin Bo-Me, who put her lover Prince Min Nyo of Kale on the throne. Saw Min Hla's eldest child Minye Kyawhtin (also known as Min-nge Kyawhtin) became the rebel king of Toungoo from 1452 to 1459.

Notes

References

Bibliography
 
 
 
 
 

Chief queens consort of Ava
14th-century Burmese women
15th-century Burmese women